Mohammad Sharif Malekzadeh (born in Zabul city, Sistan and Baluchistan province) is a former Vice President of Iran who served as the head of the Ministry of Cultural Heritage, Handicrafts and Tourism from 2012 to 2013. He has a doctorate in management and a post-doctorate in management. He is an associate professor of the university, advisor to Seyyed Mahmoud Hashemi Shahroudi in executive affairs [1], and until the end of the 9th government, vice president and head of the cultural heritage organization, handicrafts, and tourism. [2] He has previously held various government positions. Among them, we can refer to positions such as advisor to the president,[3] advisor to the minister of foreign affairs, special assistant to the minister of foreign affairs, administrative and financial deputy of the ministry of foreign affairs,[4] general secretary of Iranians abroad[5] and... He is currently the head of the Center for Research and Studies of Humanities-Islamic Sciences, the head of the World Halal Tourism Organization, and the head of the International Union of World University Presidents.[2][Requires Source]
In 2020, Dr. Mohammad Sharif Malekzadeh was chosen as the Father of the Contemporary Science of World Tourism Management by the World University Presidents Association; he is one of the world's tourism geniuses and was introduced as one of the world's top 3000 scientists by Word Press magazine.
Professor Malekzadeh, who is one of Iran's most famous people and has the National Medal of Service and Sheikh Baha'i Medal, as the creator of the MFT theory, was able to be the first inventor of the world's tourism industry by registering this important invention, which is based on improving the human spirit and mind.

Books:

Resistance economy and JCPOA
Dimensions of resistance economy in the oil industry
Transferring experience from past managers to the future
What board members should know
What mayors should know
What senior managers need to know
Comprehensive banking
The impact of information technology on the education system
Development of management in Dana insurance - challenges and solutions
Economic facilitation and development solutions
Burnout / Career Exhaustion
Poverty and economic inequality
Strategic management of social responsibility
Management of assignments in the field of health
The scientific unveiling ceremony of the first invention in the tourism industry
Corporate social responsibility in the oil industry
The success of female managers in the family
A look at the life and works of Dr. Mohammad Sharif Malekzadeh
New newspaper
Certificate of honor of Iran
Halal tourism conference

Records:
Vice President of Tourism Organization of Cultural Heritage, Handicrafts and Tourism
Vice President and Head of Cultural Heritage, Handicrafts and Tourism Organization
The manager responsible for scientific and research quarterly magazine of management and development
Member of the executive council and head of the Central Asia and Middle East region of the International Union of Deans of Islamic World Universities
Director General of Foreign Nationals and Iranians Abroad, Judiciary
Adviser to the President and Secretary General of Iranian Affairs Abroad
The inventor of the MFT theory about the effects of improving the spirit and soul in the world tourism industry
Special Assistant to the Minister of Foreign Affairs
Head of the Higher Institute of Education, Research, Management, and Planning of the country
Former Vice President of Iran and Head of Cultural Heritage, Handicrafts and Tourism Organization of Iran
The father of the modern science of world tourism is part of the pride of Iran
Member of the top 3000 scientists in the world
The first inventor in the world tourism industry with a patent: process management and quality control in tourism tours with special interests
Author of 40 books in the field of the global economy, management and tourism
Selection of the title of Iran's celebrities and celebrities in 2015 by the Association of Cultural Artifacts and Celebrities of the country
Senior Advisor at President University of Indonesia
Chairman of the Board of Directors of the Global Halal Tourism Organization (GHTO) London
Head of the Office of the International Association of Presidents of World Universities (IAUP) in the Middle East and Central Asia region.
Has a national service badge
Has the national badge of Sheikh Baha'i
The founder and father of the modern science of world tourism management
Specialized doctorate in industrial management
University professor in the field of industrial management
The manager responsible for scientific research quarterly journal of management and development
The manager responsible for the scientific research quarterly journal of planning and budgeting
The head of the management groups of Iran Higher Educational and Research Institute and Management and Planning
Director of the Department of Graduate Studies in Public Administration, Tehran Branch, Center
Chairman of the Board of Trustees of the Cultural Heritage Research Institute
Member of the board of trustees and International Vice President and Academic Vice President of Adalat University

Sources

[1]
 http://www.tasnimnews.com/fa/news/1391/09/11/2013/
 http://www.khabaronline.ir/detail/209483/Politics/4562
 http://www.entekhab.ir/fa/news/28914/
 "Archived Version". Archived from the original on August 18, 2016. Retrieved 31 July 2016.
 Collection of articles and lectures of the international conference on halal economy and halal tourism, Mehr 2016, p. 12
http://www.hamshahrionline.ir/details/192950

External link
Invention in Tourism Industry
Tourism with special interests
Special Interest Tourism

Political positions
Previous:
Ali Hashemi Behrmani, Vice President of Tourism, Head of Cultural Heritage, Handicrafts and Tourism Organization
After 1384-1388:
Hossein Fazli
supervisor
Previous:
Ali Asghar Sheardoost, Secretary of the Supreme Council for the Affairs of Iranians Abroad
After 2018-2019:
Maysam Taheri
Supervisor
Previous:
Hossein Farhi, Administrative and Financial Deputy of the Minister of Foreign Affairs
Since 2010:
Behrouz Kamalvandi
Previous:
Seyyed Hassan Mousavi, Vice President of Iran
Head of the Cultural Heritage, Handicrafts and Tourism Organization
After 1392-1391:
Mohammad Ali Najafi

Previous
Hamid Ghasemi, president of the Iran Squash Federation
After 2016-2018:
Massoud Soleimani

Scientific aspects
Previous:
Mohsen Najafikhah, head of the Higher Institute of Education and Research, Management and Planning
After 1392-1391:
Masoud Nili
Nebu
Heads of cultural heritage, handicrafts and tourism organization
Nebu
The government delegation of Mahmoud Ahmadinejad, President of Iran (1392-1384)

Heads of Cultural Heritage, Handicrafts and Tourism Organization
Living people
Year of birth missing (living people)